The Madrid peace conference letter of invitation, also known as the Madrid Invitation or Letter of invitation to the Middle East Peace Conference in Madrid, of October 19, 1991, was a formal diplomatic invitation by the United States and the  Soviet Union issued to Israel, Syria, Lebanon, Jordan and the Palestinians, calling on them to come together and hold a peace conference in Madrid, Spain. The resulting conference came to be known as the Madrid Conference that commenced on October 30, 1991.

The invitation was issued in the name of US President George H. W. Bush and  Soviet President Mikhail Gorbachev and signed by US Secretary of State James A. Baker, III and Boris Pankin for the Soviet Union, and a reply by October 23, 1991, was requested.

It is widely agreed that the invitation, which was an outcome of compromises by all sides, detailed the structure of the Madrid process in four main areas:

That there would be an opening conference having no power to impose solutions.
It called for bilateral talks with the Arab states bordering Israel.
Talks would be held with the Palestinians on a five-year period of interim self-rule, which would then be followed by talks on the permanent status.
There would be multilateral talks on key regional issues such as refugees.

Text and content of invitation
Following are the main points within the invitation (shortened version):

October 19, 1991

On behalf of President Gorbachev and President Bush, we are very pleased to convey the attached invitation...

Sincerely,
James A. Baker, III
Boris Dmitriyevich Pankin

Invitation

...United Nations and the Soviet Union believe that an historic opportunity exists to advance the prospects for genuine peace...The United States and the Soviet Union are prepared to assist...a...peace settlement, through direct negotiations along two tracks, between Israel and the Arab states, and between Israel and the Palestinians, based on United Nations Security Council Resolutions 242 and 338...

...the president of the U.S. and the president of the USSR invite you to a peace conference, which their countries will co-sponsor, followed immediately by direct negotiations...in Madrid on 30 October 1991.

President Bush and President Gorbachev request your acceptance of this invitation...

Direct bilateral negotiations will begin four days after the opening of the conference...those...focus on region-wide issues such as arms control and regional security, water, refugee issues, environment, economic development, and other subjects of mutual interest.

...Governments to be invited include Israel, Syria, Lebanon and Jordan. Palestinians will be invited and attend as part of a joint Jordanian-Palestinian delegation. Egypt will be invited...The European Community will be a participant...The Gulf Cooperation Council will be invited...The United Nations will be invited...

The conference will have no power to impose solutions on the parties or veto agreements reached by them. It will have no authority to make decisions for the parties and no ability to vote on issues or results. The conference can reconvene only with the consent of all the parties.

...negotiations between Israel and Palestinians...will be conducted in phases, beginning with talks on interim self-government...Once agreed the interim self-government arrangements will last for a period of five years...negotiations will take place on permanent status...negotiations between Israel and the Arab states, will take place on the basis of resolutions 242 and 338...

...this process offers the promise of ending decades of confrontation and conflict and the hope of lasting peace...only through such a process can real peace and reconciliation among the Arab states, Israel and the Palestinians be achieved...

Arab–Israeli peace diplomacy and treaties
Paris Peace Conference, 1919
Faisal–Weizmann Agreement (1919)
1949 Armistice Agreements
Camp David Accords (1978)
Egypt–Israel peace treaty (1979)
Madrid Conference of 1991
Oslo Accords (1993)
Israel–Jordan peace treaty (1994)
Camp David 2000 Summit
Israeli–Palestinian peace process
Projects working for peace among Israelis and Arabs
List of Middle East peace proposals
International law and the Arab–Israeli conflict

External links
Invitation to Syria, full text
Israel Ministry of Foreign Affairs, full text

Israeli–Palestinian peace process
Middle East peace efforts
Soviet Union–United States relations
Soviet Union–Syria relations
Israel–Soviet Union relations
1991 documents